Berwick-upon-Tweed television relay station is a low-power television and FM radio relay transmitter of Chatton, covering Berwick-upon-Tweed, Tweedmouth and Spittal, Northumberland. It is owned and operated by Arqiva.

Channels listed by frequency

Analogue radio

Digital television
These multiplexes became available on 26 September 2012, apart from BBC A, which was available since 12 September:

Analogue television
These services were available until 26 September 2012, apart from BBC2, which closed on 12 September:

External links
Berwick-upon-Tweed at the Transmission Gallery

Transmitter sites in England
Berwick-upon-Tweed